Wagih Abdel Azim is an Egyptian footballer who plays for Egyptian Premier League club Zamalek.

Career
In June 2010, Wagih penned a two-year contract to join Zamalek from El-Masry as a free agent.

References

External links
 خاص - التوأم يحصل على توقيع وجيه عبد العظيم 
 معلومات عن اللاعبين وآخر التحديثات 

Living people
Egyptian footballers
Zamalek SC players
Al Masry SC players
1979 births
Association football midfielders